Riverview Hall is a historic building on the campus of St. Cloud State University in St. Cloud, Minnesota, United States.  It was built in 1913 for what was then a teacher training college, to serve as a laboratory school where student teachers gained practical experience instructing local children.  The building was listed on the National Register of Historic Places in 1988 as the Model School for its state-level significance in the theme of education.  It was nominated for being Minnesota's oldest surviving teacher-training facility.

The St. Cloud Model School continued to serve its original role into the 1960s.  From 1958 to 2008, the renamed Riverview Hall was home to the university's English department.  The hall then underwent a $6.2 million renovation, reopening in 2010. The project retained the historic features of the original building while adding up-to-date innovations. Two historic classrooms, furnished in 1913 style, stand next to smart classrooms and modern communication labs.  It now houses the Department of Communication Studies.

See also
 National Register of Historic Places listings in Stearns County, Minnesota

References

External links

 Riverview Hall–St. Cloud State University

1913 establishments in Minnesota
Buildings and structures in St. Cloud, Minnesota
Colonial Revival architecture in Minnesota
Laboratory schools in the United States
National Register of Historic Places in Stearns County, Minnesota
St. Cloud State University
School buildings completed in 1913
School buildings on the National Register of Historic Places in Minnesota
University and college buildings on the National Register of Historic Places in Minnesota